The World Series of Darts is a series of darts tournaments organised by the Professional Darts Corporation.

Beginning in 2013, the World Series has comprised between two and seven tournaments across the world, where a mixture of the top-ranked PDC players take on local qualifiers in a knockout format. Since 2015, there has been a finals tournament held annually in November at the Braehead Arena in Glasgow, Scotland, although in 2018, it moved to the Multiversum Schwechat in Vienna, Austria, and moved again to the AFAS Live in Amsterdam, Netherlands in 2019, then to the Salzburgarena, Salzburg in 2020.

History
The World Series of Darts commenced in 2013 with the Dubai Duty Free Darts Masters. The goal of these series of tournaments is to make darts more popular across the globe.

Later that year, the Sydney Darts Masters took place, which as well as including 8 top-ranked PDC players, also featured 8 players from Australia and New Zealand to take part in the tournament. In 2014, tournaments in Singapore and Perth were added to the series, although this would be the only year that Singapore was used for an event.

In 2015, but the Japan tournament (later renamed as Tokyo for the 2016 tournament) and Auckland were added. Also in 2015, ended the series with the World Series of Darts Finals. In 2016, the PDC expanded into China with the addition of the Shanghai Darts Masters, and in 2017, both North America and Europe had their own tournaments with the US Darts Masters in Las Vegas, and the German Darts Masters in Düsseldorf, along with Melbourne over from Sydney in the Australian leg of the tour.

In 2018, Brisbane joined the fray and replaced Perth, whilst Dubai was excluded. It was also confirmed that Vienna, Austria would replace Glasgow as the host of the World Series Finals in 2018.

In 2019, it was announced that Cologne and Hamilton would host World Series events for the first time, with Dubai seemingly still on a back burner and China also excluded. It was also confirmed that Amsterdam, Netherlands will replace Vienna as the host of the World Series Finals in 2019.

In 2020 a new tournament, the Nordic Darts Masters, was due to take place in Copenhagen, Denmark. It was also confirmed that Salzburg, Austria will replace Amsterdam as the host of the World Series Finals in 2020. The two Australian events will move to Wollongong and Townsville.

The US Darts Masters will relocate to New York City in 2022, having been due to move in 2020 before the cancellation of the 2020 US Masters due to the COVID-19 pandemic. The events in Hamilton, Wollongong and Townsville will also play in 2022, but the only event in 2021 was the delayed Nordic Masters in Copenhagen, with the finals returning to Amsterdam in October 2021.

Venues
Since the first tournament began in 2013, the World Series has visited ten countries including the Finals.

Points in the World Series tournament
Since the World Series of Darts Finals were announced in 2015, each event includes ranking points that all players earn dependent on how far they go to through each tournament. The top 8 ranked players automatically qualify for the Finals.

Event Finals

Finalists
Up to and including the 2023 Nordic Darts Masters.

References

 
2013 establishments in Europe
2013 establishments in Asia
2013 establishments in Africa
2013 establishments in North America
2013 establishments in South America
2013 establishments in Oceania

Sports competition series